Serra de' Conti is a comune (municipality) in the Province of Ancona in the Italian region Marche, located about  west of Ancona.

Serra de' Conti borders the following municipalities: Arcevia, Barbara, Montecarotto, Ostra Vetere.

Demographic evolution

References

External links
 www.comune.serradeconti.an.it/

Cities and towns in the Marche